Kanturk Rugby Football Club is a rugby union club based in Kanturk, County Cork, Ireland, playing in Division 1 of the Munster Junior League. Founded in 1927, the club reached the All-Ireland League for the first time in 2014.

References

External links
 Official site

Irish rugby union teams
Rugby clubs established in 1927
Rugby union clubs in County Cork